Lupettiana is a genus of anyphaenid sac spiders first described by Antônio Brescovit in 1997.

Species
 it contains nine species:
Lupettiana bimini Brescovit, 1999 – Bahama Is.
Lupettiana eberhardi Brescovit, 1999 – Costa Rica
Lupettiana levii Brescovit, 1999 – Hispaniola
Lupettiana linguanea Brescovit, 1997 – Jamaica, Guadeloupe, Dominica
Lupettiana manauara Brescovit, 1999 – Brazil
Lupettiana mordax (O. Pickard-Cambridge, 1896) – USA to Peru, Brazil
Lupettiana parvula (Banks, 1903) – Cuba, Hispaniola
Lupettiana piedra Brescovit, 1999 – Cuba
Lupettiana spinosa (Bryant, 1948) – Hispaniola

References

Anyphaenidae
Araneomorphae genera
Spiders of North America
Spiders of South America
Taxa named by Antônio Brescovit